The Belarus–Lithuania border is an international border almost  in length between the Republic of Belarus (CIS member) and the Republic of Lithuania (EU member). It is an external border of the European Union as well as the western border of the Commonwealth of Independent States.  of the border is on land, while  are on water, crossing lakes, e.g. Lake Drūkšiai and following some rivers, e.g. Dysna River and Neman River.

Both countries follow the most basic rules of the freedoms of the air meaning for example that aircraft can fly over the border and through a country without special permission. However on 23 May 2021, Ryanair Flight 4978, an intra-EU flight with 171 passengers on board, crossing Belarusian airspace, was intercepted by a Belarusian MiG-29 and forced to land at Minsk Airport, where two of the passengers were arrested, which was objected by many governments and called air hijacking by a state.

On 18 January 2023, Lithuanian government renounced the agreement signed with Belarus 16 years ago on the principles of cross-border cooperation.

History 
Historical borders of and within the Grand Duchy of Lithuania and later, following the
partitions of the Polish–Lithuanian Commonwealth, governorates of the Russian Empire varied significantly throughout the history and at times bore little resemblance to the modern borders. The early formations of the current border originate after the World War I, following the establishment of the Republic of Lithuania (1918–1940) and the Lithuanian–Soviet War. The Soviet-Lithuanian Peace Treaty was signed on 12 July 1920, defining and recognizing the eastern border of Lithuania, even though it was de facto controlled by Poland due to the Polish–Lithuanian War and Polish–Soviet War. It was similar to the present border, but the Vilnius region was de facto controlled by Poland. Following the World War II and the Soviet occupation of the Baltic states, a new border was established between the Lithuanian Soviet Socialist Republic and Byelorussian Soviet Socialist Republic within the Soviet Union. It is the basis of the current border which had remained largely stable since 1940.

The border is defined by the treaty of 6 February 1995 between the two countries. The border demarcation of the border was completed in 2007. Since 2004 the border has served as the external border of the European Union and, since 2007, the Schengen Area. These developments brought increased border controls and stricter visa requirements for crossing between the two countries. An agreement signed in 2010 aims to implement simplified traveling for people living within  of the border.

Definition of the border 

The treaty defines the border as starting at the border tripoint of Lithuania, Latvia and Belarus, where there is a monument. It goes southeast across Lake Drūkšiai, following river Apyvardė, across lakes Apvardai and Prūtas, further following Dysna River to the east, and further to Adutiškis railway station. It further goes north of Belarusian settlement Lyntupy, east of the Lithuanian settlement Šumskas, across the road Vilnius - Maladzyechna, goes around the area of Lithuanian settlement Dieveniškės from the east, south and west, goes to the North of Belarusian settlement Bieniakoni, crosses the road Vilnius-Lida and further follows Šalčia river. It further continues to the south of Lithuanian city Eišiškės, follows Načia river, goes to the south of Lithuanian settlement Dubičiai, reaches the source of Kotra River and further follows this river, then across lakes Grūda ir Dubas. It further crosses the railroad Vilnius-Grodno next to the stop Senovė, and the railroad to Druskininkai to the north of the stop Pariečė, continuing west towards Neman river and up against the current, and further following Mara river to the border tripoint of Belarus, Lithuania and Poland.

On 18 January 2023, Lithuanian government renounced the agreement signed with Belarus on the principles of cross-border cooperation. The bill terminated the agreement signed by the governments of Lithuania and Belarus in Vilnius on June 1, 2006, to set out areas of cross-border cooperation between the two neighbouring countries.

2021 migrant crisis 

In June 2021, Lithuanian officials claimed that Belarusian authorities could encourage illegal migration from Iraq and Syria to Lithuania by organizing groups of refugees and helping them to cross the Belarusian-Lithuanian border. It was assumed that the state support of illegal migration could be carried out for political reasons. Illegal migration from Belarus forced Lithuania to declare state of emergency on 7 July 2021.

Lithuania is building a border barrier to stem the flow of illegal crossings. The cost of the project is estimated at €150 million and the Lithuanian parliament approved it as a matter of urgency. As of May 2022, more than 330 km of the barrier with modern surveillance equipment was built.

See also 
 Belarus–Lithuania relations

References 

 
1995 establishments in Belarus
1995 establishments in Lithuania
1995 in international relations
Borders of Belarus
Borders of Lithuania
International borders
Internal borders of the Soviet Union
European Union external borders
Border barriers constructed during the European migrant crisis